The Intramuros Administration (IA) is an agency of the Department of Tourism of the Philippines that is mandated to orderly restore, administer, and develop the historic walled area of Intramuros that is situated within the modern City of Manila as well as to insure that the 16th- to 19th-century Philippine-Spanish architecture remains the general architectural style of the walled area.

It operates autonomously from the municipal government, although the Mayor of Manila is a member of its board. It was established on April 10, 1979, as under the now-defunct Ministry of Human Settlements by virtue of Presidential Decree 1616 issued by then President Ferdinand Marcos. Executive Order No. 120 reorganized the Ministry of Tourism which became the Department of Tourism (DOT) on January 30, 1987. The order also designated the IA as an attached agency of the DOT.

Its office is located at Palacio del Gobernador in Plaza Roma.

History

On October 30, 2015, the Association of UNESCO World Heritage Cities of Spain awarded the IA the Heritage Prize 2015 for its efforts in preserving Spanish colonial architecture in Intramuros. IA, however, was flagged by the Commission on Audit for its delayed implementation of an ₱18 million branding campaign that was awarded way back in 2017.  ₱450,000 has been used so far. None of the project components: events and special projects, branding materials, online campaign, walking tour brochures and maps, and other printed media, were completed at all.

Administrators

References

1979 establishments in the Philippines
Administration
Historic preservation organizations in the Philippines
Establishments by Philippine presidential decree